Rustai-ye Taleqani (also Romanized as Rūstāī-ye Ţāleqānī; also known as Ţāleqānī) is a village in Vahdat Rural District, in the Central District of Zarand County, Kerman Province, Iran. At the 2006 census, its population was 1,553, in 392 families.

References 

Populated places in Zarand County